New Amsterdam Public Hospital in New Amsterdam, Guyana, is the country's biggest hospital after Georgetown Public Hospital. It's old building is one of the two surviving buildings designed by Cesar Castellani, an architect employed in the Public Works Department of British Guiana.

Construction commenced in late 1881 with funds provided to the Public Works Department by the colonial administration. The hospital was built in stages. The central pavilion was completed in 1881. The hospital was almost complete in 1884, and was occupied in 1885. It was described as a “timber architectural masterpiece”. The building was later declared unfit to work and left abandoned. It slowly collapsed due to vandalism and deterioration. Old location: 

In 1893, the hospital had 150 beds, four sick wards (one designated for females) each with 24 beds with a window between each bed.

The hospital moved to a new location in 2005.

References

Government buildings completed in 1885
Hospital buildings completed in 1884
Hospitals in Guyana
History of Guyana
Hospitals established in 1885
New Amsterdam, Guyana
1881 establishments in the British Empire